Charmaine Yee, also known as Yee Kah Yan, is a Singaporean radio presenter. Yee is currently a radio presenter and producer at Kiss 92FM and also works as a presentation coach.

Early life and education
Yee attended CHIJ Saint Nicholas Girls' School from 1994 to 2003. She attended Trinity College, Melbourne for Foundation Studies in December 2004, then changed to The University of Melbourne February 2005 to pursue a Bachelor of Arts (Media and Communications) with a double major in Media and Communications and International Relations. Yee was conferred her Bachelor of Arts in December 2007.

Career 
Yee started her first job in TBWA Worldwide / MEC and then in Raffles Hotel.

In January 2011, Yee became a radio presenter with Radio 91.3 (later known as One FM 91.3). In 2015, she joined Kiss 92FM as the presenter of The Afternoon Scoop 1pm-4pm. She also worked as a television presenter at FOX Sports Asia.

Yee has provided voice work for commercials and campaigns including Mercedes-Benz, Singapore Tourism Board, Workforce Singapore, Starhub, Singapore Telecoms, Nescafe Dolce Gusto, Tourism Australia, Air Asia, Pilot Pens, The Taiwan Visitor’s Association, Best Denki, TK Trichokare, Ricola and Bone Marrow Donors Programme and onboard entertainment for China Airlines and Garuda Indonesia.

As a television host, she interviewed Hollywood celebrities including Tom Hanks, Melissa McCarthy, Rebel Wilson of Pitch Perfect 3 and Henry Golding of Crazy Rich Asians (film); movie stars such as  Dwayne Johnson of Rampage, Hugh Jackman of Logan; television stars eg. Jeannie Mai of DIVA How Do I Look Asia; F1 Champions Max Verstappen, Lewis Hamilton and Daniel Ricciardo; and international artistes such as James Bay (singer), James Morrison, Nelly Furtado, Paramore, The Wanted, James Blunt, 5 Seconds of Summer, Avril Lavigne, We the Kings, Boyce Avenue and Sam Willows.

Yee is a presentation coach on Communications and Public Speaking.

References

Singaporean radio presenters
Singaporean women radio presenters
Living people
CHIJ Saint Nicholas Girls' School alumni
Singaporean people of Chinese descent
Year of birth missing (living people)